Local Government Boundary Commission may refer to:
Local Government Boundary Commission (1945–1949)
Local Government Boundary Commission for England (1972), in place until 1992
Local Government Commission for England (1992), in place until 2002
Local Government Boundary Commission for England, from 2002
Local Democracy and Boundary Commission for Wales, originally the Local Government Boundary Commission for Wales
Local Government Boundary Commission for Scotland

Local government commissions